"Winner" is the tenth and final episode of the fourth season of the AMC television series Better Call Saul, the spinoff series of Breaking Bad. The episode aired on October 8, 2018, on AMC in the United States. Outside of the United States, the episode premiered on streaming service Netflix in several countries.

Plot

Opening
In 1998, HHM's staff visits a karaoke club to celebrate Jimmy McGill attaining admission to the New Mexico bar. Chuck and Jimmy return to Jimmy's apartment where they fall asleep in Jimmy's bed as they sing "The Winner Takes It All" by ABBA, the song they sang together at the bar.

Main story
In 2004, Mike Ehrmantraut tracks Werner Ziegler to a money wire agency and convinces the clerk to let him view security camera footage. Mike guesses Werner is going to meet his wife at a hot spring resort and begins calling hotels. He notices Lalo Salamanca's car following him and evades it.

Lalo goes back to the money wire agency, kills the clerk, and reviews security footage to learn what Mike saw. Lalo calls hotels until he locates Werner, pretends to work for Gus Fring, and extracts some details of Werner's work before Mike arrives at the hotel to end the call.

Gus realizes Lalo can connect Werner's work to Gus and decides Werner must die, for which Mike takes responsibility. Werner calls his wife at the Denver airport and convinces her to return to Germany. Mike promises to make Werner's death look accidental for his wife's sake, then shoots him. Mike later reports to Gus as Gus and Gale Boetticher inspect the unfinished meth lab, which was created according to Gale's design.

Kim Wexler and Jimmy stage several events where Jimmy feigns remorse over Chuck. They intend to influence the appeal panel considering Jimmy's suspension by showing that despite his appearance at the first hearing, he really is grief-stricken about his brother's death.

Jimmy sits on a panel reviewing candidates for scholarships in Chuck's name. Jimmy tries unsuccessfully to persuade Howard Hamlin and the other members to award a scholarship to Kristy, whose background includes a shoplifting charge. Afterward, he encourages her not to stick to the upright path she is attempting to follow, but to do whatever is necessary to succeed because "the winner takes it all".

At his appeal, Jimmy gives a seemingly impromptu speech about his remorse over Chuck, promising to be "worthy of the name McGill", and wins reinstatement. He then stuns Kim by revealing his performance was insincere and states his intention not to practice under the name McGill. Kim asks Jimmy to explain and he briefly turns to face her and exclaims "S'all good, man!".

Production
"Winner" was written by Peter Gould and Thomas Schnauz. It was directed by Adam Bernstein, who also directed the episodes "Five-O", "Gloves Off", and "Slip".

This episode includes guest appearances from Michael McKean as Chuck McGill and Brandon K. Hampton as Ernesto, both of whom appear in the flashback. The directors had written the cold open with the desire to utilize McKean's background as a singer. In Episode 1 of Season 1 ("Uno"), Jimmy displays post-meeting frustration with Howard by kicking a trash can located inside the doorway between the HHM office building and parking garage. In "Winner", Jimmy passes the dented trash can, which is still visible inside the doorway.

Reception
"Winner" received critical acclaim. On Rotten Tomatoes, it garnered a perfect 100% rating with an average score of 9.1/10 based on 19 reviews. The site's critical consensus is, "An excellent ending to a bittersweet season, 'Winner' ties up loose threads while priming each of Better Call Sauls excellently drawn characters for the coming danger."

Accolades

The episode received four nominations at the 71st Primetime Emmy Awards: Outstanding Lead Actor in a Drama Series for Bob Odenkirk, Outstanding Supporting Actor in a Drama Series for Jonathan Banks, Primetime Emmy Award for Outstanding Writing for a Drama Series for Peter Gould and Thomas Schnauz, and Outstanding Guest Actor in a Drama Series for Michael McKean.

Ratings
"Winner" was watched by 1.53 million viewers on its first broadcast, earning a 0.5 rating for viewers between 18 and 49.

Notes

References

External links
 "Winner" at AMC
 

Better Call Saul (season 4) episodes
Television episodes written by Peter Gould